The Administrative Palace is a building in Satu Mare, Romania. At 97 metres, it is the highest building in Transylvania and one of the highest in the country. It is an example of brutalist style architecture.

History
From the top of the building, almost the entire Satu Mare County is visible, and one can see all the way to Hungary. The history of the building starts in the 1960s, when Satu Mare experienced a period of infrastructure development under the communist regime. The Romanian Communist Party wanted to build a new city center with a building that would be a new landmark for the city. Thus, in 1972, construction of the building began, the main architect being Nicolae Porumbescu of Iaşi, assisted by Ludovic Gyüre of Satu Mare.

The building was completed in 1984; there were over 1,000 workers employed on the project.

The building has three smaller towers and one big main tower. The three small towers represent the three ethnic groups present in Satu Mare County: Romanians, Germans and Hungarians, while the main tower represents the bond between these three ethnic groups.

Today, the building houses several government institutions, including the county council, prefecture, city hall and culture office.

References

External links
 A formal description (Romanian)

Buildings and structures completed in 1984
Skyscraper office buildings in Romania
Buildings and structures in Satu Mare
Brutalist architecture in Romania
Prefecture buildings in Romania
City and town halls in Romania